Lea-by-Backford is a hamlet and civil parish in the unitary authority of Cheshire West and Chester and the ceremonial county of Cheshire, England. It is situated between Chester and Ellesmere Port, west of the A41 trunk road and to the north of the Shropshire Union Canal.

At the 2011 census the population of the parish was 207.

In 1086, the settlement was recorded in the Domesday Book as Wisdelea.

Lea-by-Backford, including part of the hamlet of Dunkirk, was a township within the Backford parish of the Wirral Hundred. The population was recorded at 70 in 1801, 91 in 1851, 73 in 1901, 233 in 1951 and 191 in 2001.

References

External links

Villages in Cheshire
Civil parishes in Cheshire